Yuika (written: 優衣香 or ユイカ in katakana) is a feminine Japanese given name. Notable people with the name include:

, Japanese actress
, fictional character in Hanebad!, a Japanese sports manga
, Japanese women's footballer

See also
Yaeko
Yaïka
Yoiko
Yuiko

Japanese feminine given names